Gibbons is an Irish and English surname of Norman origin. The surname was first found in the counties of Limerick and Mayo, in which two distinct families arose shortly after the Norman invasion of Ireland during the 12th century.

The surname is derived from "Gibb", a short form of the popular Norman personal name Gilbert, which was first introduced in the 11th century by followers of William the Conqueror after the Norman Conquest of England. It was originally derived from the name Gislebert or Gillebert, which is composed of the Germanic elements Gisil which means "hostage", "pledge", or "noble youth," and berht, which means "bright" or "famous." 

Most of those with the surname hail from Mayo and are a branch of the great Burke family, which played a prominent role in the Norman invasion. They were originally known as "MacGibbon Burke" or "Mac Giobúin, son of Gilbert" (de Burgh). They were noted to have integrated into the local culture and customs more completely than other Norman invaders, intermarrying with native noble Irish and becoming "more Irish than the Irish themselves". 

The family from Limerick is a branch of the aristocratic FitzGerald dynasty. They were knights descended from the Irish baron John FitzThomas (FitzGerald), ancestor of The Earls of Desmond and grandson of the Norman baron Maurice FitzGerald, Lord of Llanstephan. The second branch of the FitzGerald family came to be known as "FitzGibbon" and were given the title of the White Knight, holding territory in southeast Limerick, near County Cork. The other two branches of the family were known as the Green Knight and the Black Knight, both of which kept the FitzGerald name.

Notable people 
 Abigail Hopper Gibbons (1801–1893), American schoolteacher, abolitionist, and social welfare activist
 Alan Gibbons (born 1953), English writer
 Arthur T. Gibbons (1903-1986), American businessman and politician
 Beth Gibbons (born 1965), English singer and songwriter
 Billy Gibbons (born 1949), American rock musician
 Brian Gibbons (born 1988), American ice hockey player
 Carroll Gibbons (1903–1954), American-born British bandleader
 Cedric Gibbons (1893–1960), American art director
 Christopher Gibbons (1615–1676), English composer, son of Orlando
 Conor Gibbons, Irish Gaelic footballer
 D. Barry Gibbons (1929-1998), American politician
 Dave Gibbons (born 1949), English comic book artist and writer
 David Gibbons (politician) (1927–2014), Prime Minister of Bermuda
 Edward Gibbons (1568 – before 1650), English musician, brother of Orlando
 Edward Stanley Gibbons (1840–1913), philatelist and founder of Stanley Gibbons Ltd.
 Elizabeth Joan Gibbons (1902-1988), British botanist
 Ellis Gibbons (1573–1603), English composer, brother of Orlando
 Elsie Gibbons (1903–2003), Canadian politician 
 Euell Gibbons (1911–1975), outdoorsman and proponent of natural diets
 Franco Gibbons, Palauan politician 
 Frederick Gibbons, American psychologist
 Gary Gibbons (born 1946), British theoretical physicist
 Sir George Christie Gibbons, KC (1848–1918), Canadian lawyer and businessman
 Gillian Gibbons (born 1953), British woman arrested in Sudan for naming a teddy bear Muhammad
 Grinling Gibbons (1648–1721), master wood carver
 Gwilym Gibbons (born 1971), British arts leader
 Herbert Adams Gibbons (1880–1934), American journalist
 Herbert Gladstone Coe Gibbons (1905–1963), English cricketer
 Hope Gibbons (1856–1947), New Zealand businessman
 Ian Gibbons (musician) (1952–2019), English keyboardist, member of The Kinks
 Ibedul Gibbons (1944–2021), Palauan chief
 J. Whitfield Gibbons (born 1939), American herpetologist
 James Gibbons (disambiguation)
 Jay Gibbons (born 1977), American baseball player
 Jean D. Gibbons (born 1938), American statistician

 Jim Gibbons (disambiguation) 
 John C. Gibbons (died 2021), Palauan politician 
 John Gibbons (born 1962), American baseball player and manager
 John H. Gibbons (scientist) (1929–2015), American scientist and Whitehouse advisor
 John Joseph Gibbons (1924–2018), American lawyer and judge
 John Lloyd Gibbons (1837–1919), British politician
 June and Jennifer Gibbons (born 1963, 1963–1993), identical twins known as "The Silent Twins" since they only communicated with each other
 Kieran Gibbons (born 1995), Scottish footballer
 Leeza Gibbons (born 1957), American television personality
 Lile Gibbons, American politician
 Lyman Gibbons (1808–1879), Justice of the Alabama Supreme Court
 Nolan Gibbons (2005–2020), American teen singer and member of Acapop! KIDS
 Norah Gibbons (1952–8 April 2020), Irish children's advocate and social worker
 Orlando Gibbons (1583–1625), English composer
 Paul Gibbons (born 1971), New Zealand pole vaulter
 Peter Gibbons (born 1962), Canadian racing driver
 Robert Gibbons (disambiguation)
 Sam Gibbons (1920–2012), American politician and distinguished World War II Veteran
 Scott Gibbons (born 1969), American composer
 Shay Gibbons (1929–2006), an Irish international footballer
 Simon Gibbons, Professor of Phytochemistry at the School of Pharmacy, University of London
 Stella Gibbons (1902–1989), English author
 Steve Gibbons (disambiguation)
 Thomas Gibbons (disambiguation)
 William Gibbons (congressman) (1726–1800), American lawyer and delegate to the Continental Congress
 William Conrad Gibbons (1926–2015), American military historian
 William Ernest Gibbons (1898–1976), British politician
 William M. Gibbons (1919–1990), American lawyer and railroad executive

Fictional characters 
 Augustus Eugene Gibbons, a fictional character portrayed by Samuel L. Jackson in the xXx trilogy
 Gibbons, a fictional character in The Adventures of Tintin
 Peter Gibbons, a character from the popular cult movie, Office Space
 Portia Gibbons, a fictional character in The Mighty B!
Gibbons may also be used as a first name. Notable people with the name include:
 Gibbons Bagnall (1719–1800), English poetical writer

References

English-language surnames